Kaṉpi is an Aboriginal community in the Aṉangu Pitjantjatjara Yankunytjatjara Lands in South Australia.

Kaṉpi is part of the Murputja Homelands, which also includes the family outstations Angatja and Umpukulu. The residents are mostly Pitjantjatjara people with their traditional country nearby. The settlement started as an outstation for the Baker family, who moved here from other parts on the APY lands to be closer to the country of their ancestors.

Because both Kaṉpi and nearby Nyapaṟi are small communities, there are only basic services and most of them are shared between the two towns. In Kaṉpi there is a workshop, a garage, a day care centre and an art centre. It also has a community store, built in 1996, which has a pump for petrol. Food and supplies are delivered once every two weeks. The store services both Kaṉpi and Nyapaṟi, as well as nearby outstations. Local health services are based at the clinic in Nyapaṟi. Both Kaṉpi and Nyapaṟi had their own schools from 1987, but these joined in 1993.

Population
As of 2011, the population of Kaṉpi is 113.

References

External links
Official description

Towns in South Australia
Aboriginal communities in South Australia
Anangu Pitjantjatjara Yankunytjatjara